The 2011 British Athletics Championships was the national championship in outdoor track and field for athletes in the United Kingdom, held from 29–31 July at Alexander Stadium in Birmingham. It was organised by UK Athletics. It served as a selection meeting for Great Britain at the 2011 World Championships in Athletics.

Medal summary

Men

Women

References 

Aviva World Trials & UK Championships. Power of 10. Retrieved 2020-01-21.
Aviva UK trials and championships REsults. UK Athletics (archived). Retrieved 2020-01-21.

External links
British Athletics website

British Outdoor Championships
British Athletics Championships
Athletics Outdoor
British Athletics Championships
Sports competitions in Birmingham, West Midlands
2010s in Birmingham, West Midlands